The Monkey Sanctuary was founded in 1964 by Len Williams, father of classical guitarist John Williams, as a cooperative to care for rescued woolly monkeys.  Based in Looe, Cornwall, England, the sanctuary is home to woolly monkeys that are descended from the original rescued pets, a growing number of capuchin monkeys rescued from the current UK pet trade, and a small group of rescued Barbary macaques. The monkeys live in large enclosures that the general public can view during the Sanctuary's open season in the summer months.

There is a colony of rare lesser horseshoe bats living in the cellar of Murrayton House, a 19th-century building that is the visitors' centre and accommodation for staff and volunteers. The bats can be observed from the "bat cave", a room that shows CCTV footage from an infrared camera installed in the cellar.

The Monkey Sanctuary is the flagship project of Wild Futures (UK registered Charity number 1102532). Wild Futures is dedicated to promoting the welfare, conservation and survival of primates.  Wild Futures campaigns to end the primate trade in the UK and abroad, and to end the abuse of primates in captivity.  Through talking to visitors, schools and other groups, they aim to educate the public and raise awareness about the issues primates face in captivity and in the wild, and to promote and support conservation efforts worldwide.

Notes

References

External links

 
 Wild Futures

Animal charities based in the United Kingdom
Buildings and structures in Cornwall
Co-operatives in the United Kingdom
Organizations established in 1964
Primate sanctuaries
Tourist attractions in Cornwall
Zoos in England
Zoos established in 1964
1964 establishments in England